Costel Solomon (born 29 May 1959) is a Romanian former football defender.

International career
Costel Solomon played one friendly game at international level for Romania, coming as a substitute at half-time, replacing captain Costică Ștefănescu in a 2–1 loss against Bulgaria played on the 23 August stadium in Bucharest.

References

1959 births
Living people
Romanian footballers
Romania international footballers
Association football defenders
Liga I players
Liga II players
FCM Bacău players
Victoria București players
CSM Ceahlăul Piatra Neamț players
Romanian expatriate footballers
Expatriate footballers in Israel
Romanian expatriate sportspeople in Israel
Liga Leumit players
Sektzia Ness Ziona F.C. players
Moldovan Super Liga players
Speranța Nisporeni players
Expatriate footballers in Moldova
Romanian expatriate sportspeople in Moldova
Sportspeople from Bacău